Arena Tachikawa Tachihi is an arena in Tachikawa, Tokyo, Japan. It is the home arena of the Alvark Tokyo of the B.League, Japan's professional basketball league.

In September 2018, the venue hosted the Toray Pan Pacific Open as the Ariake Coliseum was being renovated for the tennis events at the 2020 Summer Olympics.

Facilities

 Main Arena
 Dome Tachikawa Tachihi
 Tachihi Beach

References

External links

Alvark Tokyo
Basketball venues in Japan
Indoor arenas in Japan
Sports venues in Tokyo
Tachikawa, Tokyo
Sports venues completed in 2017
2017 establishments in Japan